Sarshabad (also Romanized as Sarshābād; also known as Sashāvard) is a village in Momenabad Rural District, in the Central District of Sarbisheh County, South Khorasan Province, Iran. At the 2006 census, its population was 74, in 19 families.

References 

Populated places in Sarbisheh County